Erich Kahn (1904–1979) was a German Expressionist, and a survivor of the Nazi persecution of Jews and Gypsies during the events that led to World War II.

Biography
He was born in Stuttgart and lived in Germany until, persecuted by Nazis, he found himself imprisoned at the Welzheim concentration camp. After taking refuge in England, he was interned for a while at Hutchinson Camp, on the Isle of Man. He died in London, at the age of 75.

Work
Much of Kahn's work has been lost. The main reason being he belonged to what came to be known as the "Forgotten Generation" of German Jewish Expressionism-influenced artists born at the beginning of the 20th century, whose careers were hindered by the ascension of Nazism. Forced into exile to survive, they found themselves forever bereft of their identity, "caught between yesterday and tomorrow".

The Berardo Collection has acquired a large part of Erich Kahn's body of work, which testifies to the richness of a life that even surpasses the biography A Painter's Life and Time, written by Klaus E. Hinrichsen, an art historian who was his friend for many years.

Footnotes

External links
 2 artworks by Erich Kahn at the Ben Uri site

Welzheim concentration camp survivors
1904 births
1979 deaths
20th-century German painters
20th-century German male artists
German male painters
Jewish emigrants from Nazi Germany to the United Kingdom
Jewish artists
German Expressionist painters
People interned in the Isle of Man during World War II